Kosta Šumenković (Borovac, then under the Ottoman Empire, 1829 - Belgrade, Kingdom of Serbia, 1905) was a merchant, Serbian national worker and volunteer in the Serbian-Turkish wars of 1876-1878 and the Serbian-Bulgarian War. He was the founder of the Society of St. Sava with Svetomir Nikolajević.

Biography
Kosta Šumenković was born on 16 November 1829 In the village of Borovac in Drimkol. - in the Struga nahija of the Ohrid kaza of the Ottoman Empire. He was a descendant of the famous hajduk Nedeljko called "Šumin", and the son of Atanasij and Jane. Hence the surname: "Šumin", or "Šumen" - then "Šumenkovic". Kosta did not attend school, as a very young man, he went to work. After the Crimean War 1853-1856, he went to Serbia where he practices bozadjijstvo. He also visited Imperial Russia, Austria and Germany, where he traded. Upon his return to Belgrade, he invested the money he earned and opened a shop with his partner Mihajlo Kostić "Albanez". He then set up his own shop, under his own name, at the Balkan Inn in Terazije. After the events at the Čukur Fountain in 1862, he participated with the volunteers in the siege of the Belgrade fortress and there he met Miloš Milojević. He soon made a considerable fortune, and as early as 1869 he built a Serbian school in his native village, where the teacher Stanko Lazarević began to work

Upon Milojević's return from Russia, they became great friends as like-minded people. He became a loyal follower - as a link with Southern Serbia, but also a godfather to Milojević; who died in his arms. Kosta's wife Petka is responsible for Milojević recording many old folk songs from Old Serbia. In 1873, he published a map of Miloš Milojević at his own expense: "Historical-ethnographic geographical map of Serbs and Serbian countries in Turkey and Austria." In 1876, he protested together with Todor Stanković from Niš, Despot Badžović from Kruševo before the Constantinople conference over the decision to include Old Serbia in future Bulgaria. After the founding of Miloš Milojević's volunteer corps in the Serbian-Turkish war in 1876, he joined it and distinguished himself with courage in the battles in front of Novi Pazar. In the Second Serbian-Turkish War of 1877-1878. operated in a secret committee in Niš with Todor Stanković, Miloš Milojević, Archimandrite Sava Dečance, Aksentije Hadžiarsić, Despot Badžović and Gligorije Čemerikić with the aim of facilitating the penetration of the Serbian army there. In this war, he entered Vranje with the volunteers. He also participated in the Serbian-Bulgarian war in 1885 as a volunteer.

He was one of the founding members of the Society of Saint Sava in 1886. He became a regular member and a member of the charity "Society for the Aid of Workers from Old Serbia and Macedonia", in 1899 in Belgrade. He died in Belgrade in 1905 at the age of seventy-six.

Awards and decorations
Kosta Šumenković was awarded:
 Order of the Cross of Takovo with swords, fifth-degree;
 Order of the Cross of Takovo, fourth degree;
 Order of St. Sava, fifth-degree;
 Silver Medal for Bravery (Kingdom of Serbia;
 Golden Medal for Bravery (Kingdom of Serbia;
 Order of St. Sava (est. 1883), fourth-degree;
 Order of the Karađorđe's Star;
 Society of the Red Cross of Serbia's awards and decorations;
 Nikola Petrović awarded him the Order of Prince Danilo I, fourth degree;
 Order of Saint Peter of Cetinje;
 Order of Petrović Njegoš.

War monuments
He was decorated by the Red Cross Society with his cross
From the Society of Saint Sava with his medal.
He was decorated by the Montenegrin prince Nikola Petrović with Danilo's cross of the fourth degree.

References 

1829 births
1905 deaths
People from Struga Municipality
Businesspeople from Belgrade
Serbian military personnel
People of the Serbo-Bulgarian War
Date of death unknown
19th-century Serbian people